Star Kingdom (formerly known as Star King) (1946–1967) was a Thoroughbred race horse bred in Ireland in 1946. Exported to Australia, he was an outstanding sire, being the leading sire for five seasons, the leading sire of two-year-olds seven times as well as heading the broodmare sires' list three times.

Foaled on 30 April 1946, Star Kingdom was bred by Richard Ball, master of Cloghran Stud, in County Dublin, Ireland. Star Kingdom was a son of Stardust and out of the unraced mare, Impromptu by Concerto. He was inbred to Sunstar (who won the 2,000 Guineas Stakes and The Derby), in the fourth generation (4m x 4f). Wilfred Harvey purchased him at the Doncaster sales for 3,100 guineas.

Racing record
Star Kingdom was registered and raced under the name of Star King in England. Conditioned for racing by John Waugh, in his two-year-old racing season he was rated second (to Abernant) among English sprinters. He was beaten by Abernant by the ''shortest of short heads in the National Breeders' Produce Stakes at Sandown Park and his jockey `Sam Wragg thought he had won.' Out of 16 starts he recorded nine wins and was unplaced only four times collecting £12,352 in stakes. His wins included the York Gimcrack Stakes and the Sandown Park Produce Stakes. All of his wins, with the exception of one, were by long margins of up to ten lengths. He was rated 131 by Timeform in their first ever Annual of 1948 

In 1949 Star King won the Greenham Stakes over 7 furlongs and the then 7.7 furlong Jersey Stakes at Ascot but ran disappointingly in the 2,000 Guineas and July Cup of 1949. Timeform's assessment of him  was that he possessed a fine turn of speed and was at his best when opponents did not take him off his feet too early in the race. They rated him 128 in 1949.

Stud record
Star Kingdom was purchased by Alf Ellison, Reg Moses and Stanley Wootton at a cost of £4,000 and sent to Australia in 1951. My uncle, John Burton - previously Bunfield, was the stable lad that looked after Star kingdom for the whole long journey, not an easy trip for either of them, but John's loving care enabled the horse to survive, even though he was unfairly blamed for his condition on arrival. ref: John's niece's account. Upon arrival it was obvious that he had not travelled well, and he stood only 15 hands and  inch high, leaving his purchasers with serious doubts about the wisdom of their choice. As there was already a Star King in Australia, he was re-registered as Star Kingdom and installed at Baramul Stud in New South Wales. His influence was not immediately felt, but eventually he became Australia's leading sire for the first time in the 1958–59 season when his fifth crop began racing although he was the leading sire of two-year-olds in his first season and the first sire whose earners were to reach the equivalent of $2 million. Star Kingdom was the leading sire five times, leading sire of two-year-olds seven times as well as leading the broodmare sires' list thrice.

One of his most extraordinary achievements was to sire the winner of the first five Golden Slipper Stakes. Primarily a speed sire his influence is still evident in the bloodlines of many Australian Thoroughbreds today. His progeny held Australian records for 4 furlongs, 5 furlongs,  furlongs, 8 furlongs and 10 furlongs at various times.

Among his offspring were 52 stakeswinners, including the outstanding horses Biscay, Citius, Concert Star, Todman, Fine and Dandy, Noholme, Reveille, Time And Tide, Sky High, Skyline, King Star, Kingster, Star Affair, Planet Kingdom, Kaoru Star (sire of Luskin Star, a Triple Crown winner), Mighty Kingdom, Gold Stakes, Magic Night, Starlit, Cymbal, Courteous, Sunset Hue (sire of Gunsynd) and Ritmar. The top racehorse Sky High was his most prolific winner, recording 29 wins.

Star Kingdom was also a noted broodmare sire, with the likes of his daughter Dark Jewel producing Baguette, a Golden Slipper Stakes winner who was unbeaten in his two-year-old season and future sire of note.

Standing at Barramul Stud for 16 successive seasons (1951–1966), he died from a bowel blockage, at the age of 21, on 21 April 1967. A headstone at Baramul Stud commemorates him and his son, Todman.

In 1978, more than 11 years after Star Kingdom's death, he had at least 42 sons standing at studs in Australia and New Zealand, including the very successful Kaoru Star. At the same time he also had over 100 grandsons standing at stud.

Pedigree

References

External links
 Star Kingdom - Profile of a Champion
 Star Kingdom's complete profile at Thoroughbred Heritage

1946 racehorse births
1967 racehorse deaths
Racehorses bred in Ireland
Champion Thoroughbred Sires of Australia
Australian Racing Hall of Fame horses
Thoroughbred family 1-g
Racehorses trained in the United Kingdom
Chefs-de-Race